Jim Bently is a fictional character appearing in several well-known short stories written by popular Australian writer and poet Henry Lawson. 
The somewhat more sensible member of the group, Jim is rarely found without the company of good mates Dave Regan and Andy Page. 

Jim arguably first in "The Iron-Bark Chip," which also included the characters of Dave Regan and Andy Page.

In "The Loaded Dog", Dave's imaginative idea of fishing with explosives backfires when the cartridge is left unattended. In this story, Jim is described as being uninterested in the "damned silliness" of Dave and Andy's enthusiastics efforts at fishing.

Jim Bently short stories
The Iron-Bark Chip (as Jack Bentley)
The Mystery of Dave Regan
Poisonous Jimmy Gets Left
The Loaded Dog

Characters in short stories
Male characters in literature
Literary characters introduced in 1900